Philmont Scout Ranch camps are a group of backpacking camps located in Philmont Scout Ranch, a large property in Colfax County near Cimarron, New Mexico, owned by the Boy Scouts of America and used as a backpacking reservation.  Philmont operates from one large Base Camp which includes camping headquarters, the Philmont Training Center and Villa Philmonte, the Seton Museum, fire response facilities, cattle headquarters, and an administration area.  As of 2022, there are 71 trail camps and 36 staffed camps.  Philmont's camps are generally set no more than a couple of miles apart.  Old camps are closed or relocated and new camps are opened every few years. Some camp sites are closed due to changing safety protocols. For example, camps were once located on top of Urraca Mesa and in the Baldy Saddle but these are unlikely to reopen because the locations are at risk for lightning strikes.

Base Camp
Base Camp is the center of all Philmont administration, ingress, and egress.  Most of its area is occupied by Camping Headquarters; ancillary facilities include the Seton Museum (devoted to Ernest Thompson Seton's Woodcraft Indians and other works), the Philmont Training Center and Villa Philmonte, the fire response facilities, the cattle headquarters, and the administration area. Its population exceeds that of Cimarron on most nights of the summer, according to the hiker's pamphlet.  Mark Anderson is the current head of programs.

The Welcome Center is a large pavilion, which serves as a waiting area for crews arriving or departing from the ranch as well as crews leaving or returning on a trek. The Welcome Center's small office offers check-in instructions and general information. The Camp Administration and Logistical Services manage registration and orchestrate all the ranch's operations.

There are two dining halls, one for campers and one for staff. Services is a large L-shaped building whose facilities include rental and return of gear and issuance of trail food, lockers, in which crews may store gear they do not want to take on the trail, and a post office, which handles mail for staff and crew members.

The infirmary has around the clock health personnel who communicate with backcountry staff by radio. They can dispatch vehicles to provide medical services for a patient if necessary. Tooth of Time Traders sells camping and backpacking gear as well as souvenirs. The snack bar is in the same building at the trading post and sells snack foods, ice cream, and beverages.

There are four chapels: Catholic, Protestant, Jewish, and Latter-day Saints. Each chapel holds services every evening for incoming and some outgoing crews.

There are three tent cities: Trailbound, Homebound, and Staff. Each contains several shower houses. The staff tent city's capacity is roughly 900; Trailbound and Homebound each hold between 400 and 500 trekkers.

Staffed camps

There are 36 staffed camps at Philmont, where staff members reside during the summer to run the camp's "program", which consists of a wide variety of activities. Camps often carry a historical or modern theme, such as logging (Crater Lake and Pueblano), mining or blacksmithing (French Henry, Cypher's Mine, and Black Mountain), fur trapping and mountain man life (Miranda, Clear Creek), challenge events (Dan Beard, Head of Dean, and Urraca) or Western Lore (Beaubien, Clarks Fork, or Ponil).  The program in a camp is run by staff known as program counselors.  These program counselors are supervised by a camp director.

Specific program activities include black-powder rifle loading and shooting, shotgun shooting and reloading, .30-06 rifle shooting, trail rides on horseback, burro packing and racing, rock climbing (on artificial towers as well as natural rock faces at Miner's Park, Cimarroncito and Dean Cow), tomahawk throwing, branding, search and rescue training, mountain bicycling, Mexican homesteading, blacksmithing, gold panning, obstacle courses, archeological sites, spar pole climbing, and a variety of campfires and evening programs.

Most staffed camps contain several campsites of the same sort which appear in trail camps (with the exception of French Henry and Cypher's mine which have muckshacks); however, the primary distinguishing factor is the presence of one or several cabins. There is always a main cabin, where an arriving crew is given a "porch talk" by a staff member. This includes information about available program, location of trash receptacles, and other timely information such as the presence of "problem bears." Camps in the Valle Vidal (Ring Place and Whitman Vega) have yurts, large circular semi-permanent tents which allow for bear defense but may be removed in the off-season in the interest of leave no trace camping, rather than cabins.

Most staffed camps have a swap box — a box in which crews may place unwanted food and take anything they might desire. Predictably, swap boxes usually fill up with foods that people tend not to like, get too much of, or food few want to carry. Typical finds in swap boxes include sunflower seeds and apple cider mix, however on occasion much more valuable goods can be found, such as peanut butter, Ritz Crackers, et cetera. Some crews will have an unofficial organization system where one person will eat food the others don't like, cutting down on food waste.

With several exceptions, staffed camps accept garbage, send and receive mail, and offer purified water. The exceptions are those camps which have no road access or where the camps receive their supply shipments by burro. All staffed camps contain radios, by which staff members can communicate with Logistics, the Infirmary, each other, or mobile units. The radio is used for all manner of communication, including notifications of the movements of the ranch's various vehicles, logistical inquiries between camps and Base, major and minor medical issues, and a nightly itinerary read-out which often includes world news and a weather forecast. The ranch's non-stationary staff are assigned unit numbers, by which they identify themselves on the radio.

Current staffed camps
 Abreu
A Mexican homestead beloved for its Cantina, which serves snacks and root beer. Its other program includes a Mexican dinner, goat-milking, and other farm-related activities and maintenance. It is set in the year 1912. Jesus Gil Abreu and his wife Petra, a daughter of Carlos Beaubien, established the Abreu settlement shortly after Lucien Maxwell's departure from the area in 1857; in addition to a successful ranch. Beaubien died in 1864, leaving the Abreus one-twelfth of the Beaubien-Miranda land grant, which in 1867 they sold to Maxwell for $3,500. Gertrude and Ramon Abreu built a house in the same year on the site that is currently Abreu. The house no longer remains, but its foundations serve as the base of the cantina. Waite Phillips largely abandoned the house, but built what is now called Old Abreu Camp to serve as a logging and sheep-raising center. Under BSA ownership, this became a staffed base in the 1960s, until it burned down twice and flooded three times, the last time being a part of the extensive 1965 floods. Program was shifted back to the old homestead site, known as "New Abreu" and later simply as "Abreu", where it was initially a camp for western lore and horse rides, and later for burro-packing, hunter safety, and fishing; in its early days it also served as a commissary. One early program which is still active  is the Mexican dinner, though it was moved to Harlan from 1975 to 1990. The cantina program began in 1978 in the old cabin. That same year, with the advent of the adobe program, scouts began construction the current cantina itself as part of the program. It shifted to its present interpretive format in 1989. The new cabin, meant to be an example of a typical house of the period, was built as a conservation project by the cabin restoration crew during the summer and fall of 1998.
The staff at Abreu interpret the daily life of the family of Petra and Jesus Abreu and work on an example of a small homestead. They interpret characters to explain the history of the area and the family, while leading participants in daily activities, such as goat-milking, adobe brickmaking, animal care and other aspects of homestead life. Also, there is always an opportunity to play with the animals, fish in the creek, or relax in the Cantina. Trekkers usually regard the Cantina as their favorite of the camp. An adobe building with an attached courtyard and grape arbor, it serves as a place for exhausted crews to sit down and relax. A staffer sells root beer, peanuts, other foods, and critical supplies like maps, while also offering games for participants. Special events at Abreu include cantina activities, burro-racing, and baking in an horno (adobe oven).
Elevation: .; location: South Country; water: purified from spigot; facilities: showers, latrines.

 Apache Springs
 Located in the far southwest corner of the ranch, Apache Springs sits on the edge of a large alpine meadow. While not an interpretive history camp (staff are not dressed in period clothing) the program relates the history and culture of the Jicarilla Apache who inhabited the region up until the mid 19th century. The camp features a small "village" of teepees where talks are given on the history and lifestyle of the Jicarilla as well as the opportunity to handle genuine artifacts. Scouts have the opportunity to make real arrowheads and experience a "sweat lodge". Apache Springs has the backcountry's only archery course, as well as a commissary where crews can resupply food, and white gas as needed. Named after the La Jicarilla Apache Indian tribe that dominated this area in the early 1700s. First opened as a staff camp to relieve the camper load at Fish Camp, following the 1965 flood.
Elevation: .; location: South Country, 

 Baldy Town
 Baldy Town, at the base of Mount Baldy in Colfax County, New Mexico, was a mining town serving as a base for mining operations on the mountain before mining in the area ceased and the town was abandoned. Baldy Town has a living history program interpreting the history of the Baldy Mining District. Its programs include a history of the town and occasionally gold panning.

The land around Baldy Town and Mount Baldy was purchased in 1963 by Norton Clapp, vice-president of the National Council of the Boy Scouts of America. The purchase added  to Philmont Scout Ranch.

 Beaubien
 Located at the northerly end of wooded Bonita Canyon, Beaubien is the hub of the South Country. Virtually all treks that route through the South Country come here. Some treks spend a "layover" here –  they stay here for two nights allowing for rest and relaxation during their trek. The program features the life of the cowboy, both historical and modern, with horseback rides, branding, a chuckwagon dinner partially prepared by the staff, and a western campfire. Many campers choose to brand their hiking boots, belts, and other brandable articles with either the Slash Crazy S and/or the Bar P Crazy S brands of Philmont. Beaubien is named in honor of Carlos Beaubien who, along with Guadalupe Miranda, owned the original Mexican land grant of which Philmont is now a part. Beaubien is Philmont's largest camp, with 34 campsites. Named after Charles Beaubien who was a French Canadian trapper who deeded a tract of land with Guadalupe Miranda that ended up being over 1,000,000 acres. Beaubien camp was known as Rincon Bonito in the 1940s.
Elevation: .

 Black Mountain

 Black Mountain is at the site of a cabin used by Samuel Matthews in 1897-1898. That same cabin is still used today and its an example of a small homestead that many settlers established on the Maxwell Land Grant. It’s one of two staff camps that cannot be reached by vehicle (the other being Crooked Creek). The camp also has a blacksmithing forge, campfire ring, and rifle range. Crews who come here take a step back in time in a way that few other interpretive history camps at Philmont are able to do. The program is a hybrid of homesteading, mining, and early western settlement, set in reconstruction era America. Staff portray the roles of civil war veterans who have come west to carve out new lives, work for the Cimarron Indian Agency, and perhaps begin a settlement. Black-powder shooting skills and blacksmithing are taught in a manner where participants can appreciate the range of skills that were necessary to settle the West. Because this camp is inaccessible to vehicles, the staff must bring provisions in and garbage out of camp on foot. For this reason, staff does not accept garbage from crews. The camp is located along the North Fork Urraca Creek at the southwesterly base of Black Mountain, one of the more prominent peaks on the ranch. Latrines are back-to-back and sit in the open.
Elevation = ; ; water: stream, must be treated

 Carson Meadows
 Opened in the summer of 2004, Carson Meadows was converted to a staff camp during the summer of 2005 it is the southernmost camp on the Ranch. Located above the Rayado Canyon to the south, it is a short hike from Abreu, turning south at the Old Abreu trail camp. Carson Meadows is situated on a gorgeous meadow surrounded by thick woods. From the cabin there are views of the Tooth of Time, framed by Fowler Mesa to the west and Urraca Mesa to the east. Carson's program is Search & Rescue/Wilderness Medicine.

 Chase Cow
 Although Chase Cow had been a trail camp before, in 2019 it became a staffed camp in order to replace Dean Cow's program, as the latter had been lost in the 2018 Ute Park Fire. It is located on the Chase Ranch property and utilizes the many natural rock formations for natural rock climbing and bouldering.
 Chase Ranch
 A staffed camp established in 2014 on a neighboring landowner's property. The program includes lodge tours.(see Chase Ranch)
 Cimarroncita
 Also known as "Cita", this former girl scout camp was incorporated into Philmont as a staffed camp in the 2021 season. The program includes 3-dimensional archery, hunter safety, and laser shooting range.
 Cimarroncito
 The hub of the Central Country, also known as "Cito", this camp provides rock climbing and an excellent conservation site. Its conservation staff have been working to restore the meadow to its former state to improve the water table for the village of Cimarron. In 2015, the Conservation Department worked on constructing a new trail through Hidden Valley. Cito contains camper shower facilities and chapel services. Cimarroncito was the location of the Central Country commissary until 1979, when Ute Gulch opened slightly to the north. The old commissary building is now occupied by the indoor climbing gym. Cito has 28 campsites. Originally known as Black Mountain Base Camp. Cimarroncito is spanish for “little wild boy.” Up through 1978, Cimarroncito was also a commissary camp. In 1979 the commissary and trading post was moved to the new camp Ute Gulch. After the Ute Park fire in 2018 and the closure of Ute Gulch, Cimarroncito is once again functioning as a commissary camp.
 Clarks Fork

 A living history camp, interpreting the life of the western cowboy, with programming such as horseback rides, branding, chuckwagon dinners and a western campfire. A very busy camp and typically gets extremely crowded with crews moving in both directions. The camp also contains a steer-roping practice area and two sets of horseshoe pits. Due to its proximity to Philmont's base camp and its function as a funnel for crews finishing their treks via the Tooth of Time, Clarks is a large and busy camp. For dinner, Scouts and leaders are served a "chuckwagon" beef stew, a signature of Philmont. Many crews take trail rides on the camps horses. Rides can be reserved in advance by crew leaders. Clarks Fork is a place to get belts, boots and other gear branded with the Philmont horse brand or cattle brand.
Elevation: ; Sites: 21; ; water: in-camp spigots; facilities: showers; program: Western Lore, Horse Rides, Chuckwagon Dinner.

 Clear Creek
 This camp features the history of the fur trade prior to 1840. Program includes loading and shooting muzzleloading black-powder rifles, a demonstration of beaver trapping techniques, tomahawk throwing, and a talk on the history of the North American fur trade and examination of artifacts in the "trappers cabin". Evening activities consist of the telling of "yarns", or folklore tales from the days of the fur trade. Cold, wet weather (even snow) is not uncommon during the summer months at this elevation. Clear Creek is located near the headwaters of the Rayado River and is named after the original name of Mount Phillips, Clear Creek Mountain. The actual Clear Creek flows off of the north side of Mount Phillips within the Cimarron Canyon Wildlife Area. It is the first interpretive staff camp at Philmont.

 Crater Lake
 This camp sits on a large incline above 8000 feet on the eastern slopes of Fowler Pass between Fowler Mesa and Trail Peak. The theme of the camp is early 20th century logging, and staff portray the historical Continental Tie and Lumber Company, which operated to the north in the Ponil Canyons. Activities include spar pole climbing and hand-hewn railroad tie construction. The staff also hosts a campfire with a clear view of the Tooth of Time. The lake more closely resembles a pond and is not actually located in a crater. It was formed by a rock slide from the slopes of Fowler Mesa which created a natural bowl fed by a spring. Waite Phillips used Crater Lake as a pack station for his trips to Rayado Lodge (Fish Camp). It has been a staff camp since 1947.
Elevation: .

 Crooked Creek
 One of the more primitive staffed camps, Crooked Creek is similar to Black Mountain in that it is not accessible by vehicle. The camp is located on the edge of a large, high meadow and features programs related to the life of the homesteader. Originally a staffed camp, Crooked Creek became a trail camp until 1990, when homesteading was added to Philmont's interpretive history camps. In 1990, Crooked Creek was among the first camps (along with Cimmaroncito and Abreu) in Philmont's history to feature coed staff. Like many other of Philmont's interpretive history camps, the staff live as primitively as the life they portray. Set in the year 1875, Crooked portrays a homesteading family making a living on a small portion of the Maxwell Land Grant. Named Crooked Creek because it lies next to an area of the Rayado Creek that bends. Crooked Creek was a trail camp until 1990 when the Homesteading program was introduced. It is one of two staff camps that cannot be reached by vehicle.

 Cypher's Mine
 This camp is located along the upper reaches of the North Fork Cimarroncito River. The program revolves around gold and other "hard rock" mining that historically occurred in the area. The program highlight is touring of the Contention mine, a small prospect mine within the camp.  Other program activities include Blacksmithing and gold panning. The camp is named in honor of Charlie Cyphers who was a manager for the Colorado Consolidated Verde Mining and Milling Company. Cypher's Mine is one of the two camps on the ranch where crews do not pitch tents at their campsites(The other being French Henry). Due to the narrow, rocky canyon in which the camp is located, campsites contain three-walled roofed structures officially referred to as "adirondacks". Local camp vernacular for them, however, is "muck shacks". A variety of original structures and artifacts from the mining days of the late 19th century are featured at this camp. Cypher's Mine features an evening musical program called a "Stomp" inside one of the old structures, modeled after the evening revelry of miners. “Charlie’s Cabin” is still used every evening for the “stomp.”

 Dan Beard
Located in the burn zone from the 2002 Ponil Complex Fire, Dan Beard is a home to a challenge course similar to those found at Urraca and Head of Dean. First used as a staff camp in 1969, the program was Dutch oven cooking. The camp closed and used as a trail camp until 1989, when the current program was started. The program is designed to teach teamwork and critical thinking skills within a group. In 2006, Dan Beard received a new challenge course wall and new campsites to replace those lost in the fire. Three sites are located a short hike up a hill in the canyon, while the rest of the camp sites are nestled in the hills behind the challenge course. During the summer 2011 season, the Dan Beard staff also included a nightly yoga program. Named after Bob Dean, a one-time cattle foreman in the area.
Elevation: ; location .

 Fish Camp
 In 1908, George H. Webster (for which Webster Pass is named after) built a cabin for the use of his Urraca Ranch. Waite Phillips then used this location for his fishing lodge which he called the Rayado lodge. Formerly known as Rayado Lodge, Fish Camp is the site of the three original hunting and fishing lodges of Waite Phillips, located in the South Country. The camp is interpretive, set in the year 1927, and features lodge tours, fly tying, and fly fishing. Fish Camp is notable as one of Waite Phillips's "favorite spots on the Ranch," according to son Chope who used to visit every year until he passed away in 2015.
Elevation: .

 French Henry
 Located in a deep, narrow canyon just below Baldy Mountain, French Henry features programs revolving around the rich mining history of the Baldy country. Gold panning, blacksmithing, a mining history museum, and a tour of a small portion of the massive Aztec mine are featured here. The main part of this camp contains the foundations of an old ore mill from the French Henry mine. This is one of the only places on Philmont where crews can consistently find actual gold in their pans. The camp contains two original structures built in between the 1860s and the 1920. The oldest serves as a mining museum while the other serves as the main cabin. Numerous artifacts from the mining operations in the area are displayed, as well as geologic maps of the Baldy country. The last building was built by Philmont and serves as sleeping quarters for the staff. French Henry is one of the camps on the ranch where crews do not pitch tents at their campsites due to the narrow, rocky canyon in which the camp is located. Campsites contain small three-walled roofed structures referred to as "Muck Shacks". Volunteer geologists working with the staff occasionally provide geology talks and gold panning lessons to campers. French Henry is named in honor of Henry Buruel, a Frenchman who mined in the area as early as 1869. Stories of the untimely death of numerous mine workers have led to the rumors that the camp is haunted. Staff often play along by making spooky noises while in the mine, and telling stories about "tommyknockers" to campers.
Elevation: .; location: North Country, .

 Head of Dean
 Head of Dean is a crossroad for much of the North Country, with routes passing through from north, south, east, and west. They run a COPE course and do an evening hike to the Head of Dean as an activity. Head of Dean's name is derived from its location, situated at the start of Dean Canyon. Head of Dean was originally a staffed camp from 1971 through 1976 with a program of Lumbering and Astronomy. It was a trail camp from 1977 through 1982. It was staffed again in 1983 with its current program.
Elevation 

 Hunting Lodge
 Centered on the well-maintained cabin built by Waite Phillips for his many hunting excursions, the Hunting Lodge is located in a busy area of the ranch's central country, and serves as a hub for vehicles and for trekkers passing between Cypher's Mine, Clarks Fork and Cimarroncito. It also serves as a major attraction for the youth participants of the Philmont Training Center. Built in 1926, this is the site of Waite Phillips’ Hunting Lodge. It is also where the original Cimarroncito Base Camp was located. The remains of the old Cimarroncito shower houses, dining hall and cabins can be seen on both sides of the road. The camp was re-opened as a staff camp in 2001 and has been giving lodge tours ever since.

 Indian Writings
 Indian Writings hosts many petroglyphs on the large rock faces around the camp. There are a few excavation sites and archaeological digs corresponding to these ancient writings, each with their own stories. Campers usually take the hour to an hour and a half tour of the easy-to-reach writings and excavation sites. Crews beginning and ending their trek are the most common, as it is located close to 6-Mile Gate turnaround.  Program includes museum tours, tours of the petroglyphs and excavation sites, as well as atlatl throwing. Indian Writings is one of the oldest staff camps on the Ranch, opened in 1939. Indian Writings is named for the Anasazi Native American petroglyphs which exists in this area. It is one of the oldest Philmont camps, first used in 1939 as part of Philturn Rocky Mountain Scout Camp. In the old days, it was referred to as “scribblins,” but now it’s called “IW.”

 Metcalf Station 
 One of Philmont's newest staff camps, opened in 2014, Metcalf Station is situated on the former site of the Cimarron & Northwestern Railway, approximately halfway between Indian Writings and Dan Beard.  Named for Colfax County Deputy Sheriff William Metcalf who was ambushed during the Settlers War. The program includes railyard blacksmithing and railroad construction, using ties from Crater Lake and Pueblano camps' tie-making programs.  The staff performs a music show for campers in the evenings.

 Miners Park
 This South Country camp is noted for its rock climbing and traverse wall. The camp is built around a large meadow, in which mountain lions may appear to hunt mule deer and other such prey. The program area is arguably the farthest on the ranch from the actual campsites, typically a 30-minute hike up to the rock formation known as "Betty's Bra." The meadow here once served as a Sunday gathering spot for miners and their families in this area. Miners Park has been staffed since 1966
Elevation: .

 Miranda
 This North Country camp is home to a large meadow with a black-powder rifle range along with a throwing tomahawk range. The staff portray a mountain man/fur-trappers rendezvous, and display various trappers and traders wares in the cabin and the teepees in the meadow. Miranda is noted for its evening activity, Mountain Ball, a variant of baseball with five bases and two teams in the field at any one time. After Mountain Ball, it is tradition for all participants to yell "We are the finest Mountain Ball players in all the land! Bring us your finest meats and cheeses!" towards Head of Dean camp. As it is uncommon for crews to beat the staff in Mountain Ball, crews that do defeat the staff earn prizes such as pudding or powdered donuts.  As with Ponil, campers can pick up and drop off burros at Miranda. Named after Guadalupe Miranda. He and Carlos Beaubien petitioned the Governor of Mexico for the original land grant in 1841. Beaubien recruited Miranda to obtain the land grant because he was a friend of Mexican Governor Manuel Armijo.
 Phillips Junction
 Established in 1975, this is the South Country hub. The camp features the commissary, a well stocked trading post, showers, latrines, and purified water.. Originally named Porkado, this camp has been used as a commissary since 1974. It changed names to Phillips Junction in 1975 and is commonly referred to as PJ. For many years, burros were used to haul food from PJ to Apache Springs, Clear Creek and Fish Camp. In 1989, an experiment using llamas to make food runs was conducted, but was switched back to burros the following year.
Elevation .

 Ponil
 The former base camp for the Philturn Rocky Mountain Scout Camp, Ponil has a commissary and trading post. Ponil is named after the Apache plume, a knee-high bushy plant that has five points, just as five canyons converge at this location. Initially, Ponil was referred to as "5 points." Ponil provides camping and a Western Lore program. Western Lore program includes: A cantina, cantina show, chuckwagon dinner and breakfast, lassoing, branding, horse shoes, and Cowboy Action Shooting.  Cowboy Action Shooting involves Colt Single Action Army replica revolvers, Winchester Model 1892 replicas, and double-barrel shotguns. Crews can also learn from the wrangler staff how to pack burros, and then take them along with them until they reach Miranda. There is a fifty pound weight limit for how much the burros can carry, which typically is equal to three days of trail meals. Many crews also take horseback/dude rides here, in which the wrangler staff take campers on a scenic ride of the forest and surrounding area. Ponil is the starting and ending location for many North Country Cavalcades, where instead of backpacking for 10 days, a crew rides horses from camp to camp along a set itinerary. 
Elevation: .; location: North Country, 

 Pueblano
 Set in 1914 as a logging camp of the Continental Tie and Lumber Company, Pueblano immerses scouts in the ways of the logger. Pueblano is Spanish for “little village” and was originally a part of the Philturn Rocky Mountain Scout Camp. This is where the Continental Tie and Lumber Company was started in 1907 to make railroad ties and timber for mines from the trees in the Ponil Canyons. Their program offers scouts the opportunity to spar-pole climb, as well as teaching them how to use period tools in creating their own hand-hewn railroad ties, which are used at Metcalf Station. In the evening, Scouts play "Loggerball" and attend the Company Meeting. Loggerball is a game similar to baseball, but played with slightly modified rules and played on a sandlot style field. The teams are either the Loggers, also known as the South Ponil Log Dogs, vs Campers or the teams are split up evenly. The Company Meeting is a campfire style show featuring period songs and stories.
Elevation: .; location: North Country, .

 Rayado
 Located on the first permanent settlement of the Beaubien-Miranda Land Grant. It was the site picked by Lucien Maxwell the late 1840s and Kit Carson lived here from 1849-1851. Rayado currently means “striped” in Spanish, but formerly meant “line” -- as in boundary line. It was used as a base camp in 1947 and at the time was called Carson-Maxwell or Car-Max. Located 7 miles (usually traveled by bus) from base camp, Rayado features a replica 1860s hacienda once owned by mountain man Kit Carson. Program includes interactive tour of the Kit Carson Museum, demonstrations of blacksmithing, woodworking, cooking, or tomahawk throwing. Situated on Highway 21, this is one of the few areas of Philmont open to the public.

 Rich Cabins
 Rich Cabins is located outside Philmont boundaries, on Ted Turner's Vermejo Park Ranch. The Rich family lived at this location from the late 1880s to the 1920s. Named after the five Rich brothers, who originally came from Austria in the 1890’s. They bought the land from Timothy Ring of Ring Place and used it for ranching. The heart brand that they used was later purchased by the Chase Ranch. The camp's program is focused on homesteading, with activities including historical cabin tours, gardening, milking goats, milking cows, shoveling manure, tending to the burros, and various other projects that the staff may be working on to improve the camp. Rich Cabins also has a commissary.  Staff perform a musical variety show for campers in the evenings.

 Ring Place
 Ring Place is located off-ranch in the Valle Vidal, on the site of Timothy Ring's homestead.  Named after Timothy Ring, a one-armed Civil War veteran pioneer homesteader. Ring purchased the 320 acre ranch on the Maxwell Land Grant in 1890 for $960. Program at Ring involves meteorology, astronomy, commissary services, and history lessons about the Valle Vidal.  Campers can learn how to construct rudimentary weather equipment such as manometers, anemometers, and barometers, as well as learning about local weather patterns.  At night, staff offer participants a chance to use the camp's 19 inch Newtonian telescope to view stars, planets, nebulae, globular clusters, and even galaxies.  Campers often elect to hike to Whiteman Vega for mountain bike program during the day.  Ring Place is located on Forest Road 1950, and is accessible to the general public whenever the Valle Vidal is open to visitors. This program was originally located at Santa Claus until 1992, when the camp was closed due to the well drying up.

 Santa Claus
 Santa Claus's program is primarily reloading and shooting 12-gauge shotgun shells. Santa Claus was reinstated to staffed camp status in the 2019 season, following the 2018 Ute Park Fire which made it impossible to use Harlan for program. Santa Claus was a staffed camp until the mid-1990s. One of the main reasons it closed was because the well stopped pumping enough water to sustain a full staff. The area suffered during the 2002 Ponil Complex fire, though the abandoned cabin still stands. In 2000, lightning struck one of the bear cables and the bear bags on the line exploded, leaving the trees charred from where the bear cables were attached.

 Sawmill
 Sawmill has a wood-fired boiler for hot showers as well as a commissary and a program focused on high-powered rifle shooting. The name comes from a logging operation that once logged in this canyon before Waite Phillips purchased the property.

 Urraca
 Urraca is situated on the north side of Urraca Mesa with a view to the North, looking toward Base Camp. The camp program includes a challenge course like Dan Beard or Head of Dean.  These activities designed to help instill a sense of teamwork within the crew while teaching them to be willing and ready to think outside the box. Spanish for “magpie”, a large black and white bird that is frequently seen around the area. It became a staff camp in 1969 and has featured astronomy, rock climbing, bow hunting, survival and search and rescue before becoming a challenge course camp. Campsites are neatly separated from the program area and sited along a hillside in the ponderosa pines next to a meadow. Most crews arrive at Urraca after the grueling climb up and over the mesa. Legend holds that Urraca Mesa is haunted, with tales ranging from eerie blue lights to "imps" running around at night. Crews crossing the mesa might encounter some cattle.

 Whiteman Vega
 A Valle Vidal camp. Whiteman Vega is situated in a large grassy meadow, with views of Baldy Mountain and Little Costilla. Staff at Whiteman offer a mountain bike riding program on the only official trail in the Valle.  Whiteman Vega is Philmont's only camp to offer this program. Named after Donald Whiteman.

Trail camps
Trail camps do not have permanent staff. Trail camps typically contain several campsites, but are spread out over half a mile of trail or more, to avoid a sense of crowding. Each trail camp is identified by a map, attached to a tree or the side of a latrine at every trail which passes through it. Trail camps do not necessarily have a nearby water source. Camps without a nearby water source referred to as "dry camps".

Individual campsites are marked by a wooden sign nailed to a tree which indicates the campsite number. Signs should not be touched by anyone, to preserve them. Camps have a metal fire ring, which may be used for small fires unless a fire ban is in place, which is often the case, given Philmont's dry climate. A bucket/ pail of water must always be readily available in the case that the fire grows out of control. There is also a sump, an L-shaped plastic pipe, with a partly exposed two-foot vertical section and a ten-foot perforated horizontal section underground. The exposed pipe is capped with a piece of mesh.  Sumps are used to dispose dirty dishwater. Dishes and pots must stay around the sump to not attract bears. 

There are some trail camps that do not have any infrastructure or campsites. These trail camps are called "Leave No Trace" camps. Leave No Trace campsites are not marked and have no exact boundaries. At these camps, participants utilize the principals of low impact camping meaning impact is spread out. This is in contrast to the standard trail camp where concentrated impact is practiced. The goal of concentrated impact is to minimize the area of effect of any impact from camping. All impact should be concentrated to designated campsites and infrastructure. 

Several campsites usually share a bear cable away from the campsite. This is a metal cable strung between two sturdy trees at least ten feet above the ground; it is used to hang bear bags containing items that might attract animals.

Campsites also share a latrine or toilet. Philmont latrines have the possibility of housing spiders below the seat, which is why campers are encouraged to remove possible pests on the underside of the boards with a stick.  The latrines come in different configurations, but all of them are for excrement only, and are not to be urinated in, in order to reduce smell. The open-air style latrine with two adjacent seats is affectionately called the "pilot to copilot" design; this results from the joking conversation which often takes place between two campers using the toilet simultaneously. The other open-air configuration latrine, called the "pilot to bombardier", is generally preferred because its two seats are back-to-back and offer somewhat more privacy than the "pilot to copilot". Occasionally a "single pilot" - one open-air seat — may be found. The enclosed configuration, with walls and a red roof, is known as a Red Roof also often referred to as a Red Roof Inn, in joking reference to the hotel chain. Older Red Roof Inns contain two adjacent seats and no doors (also known as "pilot to copilot"), while newer models have two back-to-back seats (also known as "pilot to bombadier"), with a wall between. Portable toilets (sometimes colloquially referred to as "Time Machines") are rare in the backcountry and as of 2022, are only found at the French Henry camp.

See also

 Project COPE
Philtrek.com

References

Philmont Scout Ranch
Buildings and structures in Colfax County, New Mexico
Backpacking
Wilderness